William Hansen (born 4 April 1939) is a Belgian former field hockey player. He competed in the men's tournament at the 1968 Summer Olympics.

References

External links
 

1939 births
Living people
Belgian male field hockey players
Olympic field hockey players of Belgium
Field hockey players at the 1968 Summer Olympics
People from Uccle
Field hockey players from Brussels